This is a list of electoral divisions and wards in the ceremonial county of Bedfordshire in South East England. All changes since the re-organisation of local government following the passing of the Local Government Act 1972 are shown. The number of councillors elected for each electoral division or ward is shown in brackets.

Unitary authority councils

Bedford
Wards from 1 April 1974 (first election 7 June 1973) to 5 May 1983:

Wards from 5 May 1983 to 2 May 2002:

Wards from 2 May 2002 to 5 May 2011:

Wards from 5 May 2011 to 2023:

Wards from 2023:

Central Bedfordshire
Wards from 1 April 2009 (first election 4 June 2009) to 5 May 2011:

Wards from 5 May 2011 to 2023:

Wards from 2023:

Luton
Wards from 1 April 1974 (first election 7 June 1973) to 6 May 1976:

Wards from 6 May 1976 to 1 May 2003:

Wards from 1 May 2003 to present:

Former county council

Bedfordshire
Electoral Divisions from 1 April 1974 (first election 12 April 1973) to 2 May 1985:

Electoral Divisions from 2 May 1985 to 5 May 2005:

Electoral Divisions from 5 May 2005 to 1 April 2009 (county council abolished):

Former district councils

Mid Bedfordshire
Wards from 1 April 1974 (first election 7 June 1973) to 3 May 1979:

Wards from 3 May 1979 to 1 May 2003:

Wards from 1 May 2003 to 1 April 2009 (district abolished):

South Bedfordshire
Wards from 1 April 1974 (first election 7 June 1973) to 6 May 1976:

Wards from 6 May 1976 to 2 May 2002:

Wards from 2 May 2002 to 1 April 2009 (district abolished):

Electoral wards by constituency

Bedford
Brickhill, Castle, Cauldwell, De Parys, Goldington, Harpur, Kempston East, Kempston North, Kempston South, Kingsbrook, Newnham, Putnoe, Queen's Park.

Luton North
Barnfield, Bramingham, Challney, Icknield, Leagrave, Lewsey, Limbury, Northwell, Saints, Sundon Park.

Luton South
Biscot, Caddington, Crawley, Dallow, Farley, High Town, Hyde and Slip End, Round Green, South, Stopsley, Wigmore.

Mid Bedfordshire
Ampthill, Aspley Guise, Barton-le-Clay, Clifton and Meppershall, Cranfield, Flitton, Greenfield and Pulloxhill, Flitwick East, Flitwick West, Harlington, Houghton, Haynes, Southill and Old Warden, Marston, Maulden and Clophill, Shefford, Campton and Gravenhurst, Shillington, Stondon and Henlow Camp, Silsoe, Streatley, Toddington, Turvey, Wilshamstead, Wootton.

North East Bedfordshire
Arlesey, Biggleswade Holme, Biggleswade Ivel, Biggleswade Stratton, Bromham, Carlton, Clapham, Eastcotts, Great Barford, Harrold, Langford and Henlow Village, Northill and Blunham, Oakley, Potton and Wensley, Riseley, Roxton, Sandy Ivel, Sandy Pinnacle, Sharnbrook, Stotfold.

South West Bedfordshire
All Saints, Chiltern, Dunstable Central, Eaton Bray, Grovebury, Heath and Reach, Houghton Hall, Icknield, Kensworth and Totternhoe, Linslade, Manshead, Northfields, Parkside, Planets, Plantation, Southcott, Stanbridge, Tithe Farm, Watling.

See also
List of parliamentary constituencies in Bedfordshire

Sources
http://www.opsi.gov.uk/si/si2007/uksi_20071681_en_1

Bedfordshire
 
Wards